Ancistrothyrsus is a genus of flowering plants belonging to the family Passifloraceae.

Its native range is Venezuela to Peru.

Species:

Ancistrothyrsus hirtellus 
Ancistrothyrsus tessmannii

References

Plantaginaceae
Plantaginaceae genera